Year 636    (DCXXXVI) was a leap year starting on Monday (link will display the full calendar) of the Julian calendar. The denomination 636 for this year has been used since the early medieval period, when the Anno Domini calendar era became the prevalent method in Europe for naming years.

Events 
 By place 

 Byzantine Empire 
 Arab–Byzantine War: Emperor Heraclius assembles a large army consisting of contingents of Byzantines, Slavs, Franks, Georgians, Armenians, and Christian Arabs. He establishes a base at Yaqusah (near Gadara), close to the edge of the Golan Heights, protecting the vital main road from Egypt to Damascus. The base is protected by deep valleys and precipitous cliffs, well supplied with water and grazing.
 Summer – Heraclius summons a church assembly at Antioch, and scrutinises the situation. He accepts the argument that Byzantine disobedience to God is to blame for the Christian disaster in Syria. Heraclius leaves for Constantinople with the words, ‘Peace be with you Syria — what a beautiful land you will be for your enemy’.

Central America
April 28 – Yuknoom Chʼeen II becomes the ruler of the Mayan city state of Calakmul in southern Mexico and reigns for 50 years until his death in 686.

 Europe 
 Chintila is elected by a convention of bishops and nobles (in accordance with the 75th canon of the Fourth Council of Toledo) as ruler of the Visigoths, after the death of King Sisenand.
 Rothari (formerly duke of Brescia) marries widowed Queen Gundeberga, and succeeds Arioald as king of the Lombards. During his reign, he puts many insubordinate nobles to death.

 Arabia 
 August 15–20 – Battle of Yarmouk: In engagements along the Yarmouk River, Muslim forces (25,000 men) of the Rashidun Caliphate, led by Khalid ibn al-Walid, decisively defeat the armies of the Byzantine Empire, effectively completing the Muslim conquest of Syria. It will be regarded as one of the most decisive battles in military history, marking the first great wave of Muslim conquests, after the death of Muhammad.
 The city of Basra (modern Iraq) is founded on the Shatt al-Arab, at the head of the Persian Gulf. The port will become a major trading center for commodities from Arabia, India, and Persia.
 November 16–19 – Battle of al-Qādisiyyah: The Muslim Arab army defeats the Persian forces under Rostam Farrokhzād, at Al-Qādisiyyah (Southern Mesopotamia).

 Asia 
 The Xumi Pagoda of Zhengding (China) is built, during the reign of Emperor Taizong of Tang.

 By topic 
 Literature 
 The historical texts of the Book of Northern Qi, Book of Chen, and Book of Sui are compiled in China, during the Tang Dynasty.

 Religion 
 Birinus, Bishop of Dorchester, converts Cwichelm (son of king Cynegils of Wessex) to Christianity. He dies soon afterward, and is supposedly buried at Scutchamer Knob, in East Hendred (South East England).
 June 30 – Fifth Council of Toledo: Chintila orders a meeting in the church of St. Leocadia; the bishops accept a decree that only Gothic nobility (with military functions) may be king of the Visigothic Kingdom.

Births 
 Æthelthryth, Anglo-Saxon princess (approximate date) 
 Lambert of Maastricht, bishop (approximate date)

Deaths 
 April 4 – Isidore of Seville, archbishop and scholar
 Arioald, king of the Lombards
 Bahman Jadhuyih, Persian general
 Dervan, prince of the Sorbs 
 Ecgric, king of East Anglia (approximate date)
 Cwichelm, king of Wessex (approximate date)
 George Pisida, Byzantine poet (approximate date)
 Jalinus, Armenian nobleman
 Rostam Farrokhzād, Persian general (or 637)
 Sa'd ibn Ubadah, companion of Muhammad (approximate date)
 Sisenand, king of the Visigoths
 Theodore Trithyrius, Byzantine general (sacellarius)
 Zhangsun, empress of the Tang dynasty (b. 601)

References

Sources